Yarber is the surname of the following people:

Eric Yarber (born 1963), American football coach and player
Jack Yarber (born 1967), American singer, songwriter, and guitarist
Robert Yarber (born 1948), American painter
Tony Yarber (born 1978), American pastor, educator and politician